SMTC may refer to:

 Santa Monica Track Club, a professional running group

 St. Moritz Tobogganing Club, founder of the Cresta Run toboggan track in Switzerland
 SMTC, the NASDAQ symbol of Semtech, an electronics technology company in California, United States
 SMTC Corporation, an international electronics manufacturing services provider
 Special Missions Training Center, a U.S. military maritime security training center now known as the Joint Maritime Training Center
 Sporadic medullary thyroid cancer, a type of thyroid cancer
 Syndicat mixte des transports en commun, public transportation schemes in Belfort, Clermont-Ferrand, Grenoble, and Toulouse, in France